Unión Deportiva Logroñés "B", also known as Logroñés Promesas, is the reserve team of UD Logroñés. It is based in Logroño, in the autonomous community of La Rioja. Founded in 2009 it currently plays in Segunda División RFEF – Group 2, holding home matches at Estadio Las Gaunas, with a capacity of 16,000 seats.

History 
In the 2018-19 season the club finished 4th in the Tercera División, Group 16.

Season to season

2 seasons in Segunda División RFEF
7 seasons in Tercera División

Current squad

References

External links
Official website 
La Preferente team profile 

Football clubs in La Rioja (Spain)
Sport in Logroño
UD Logroñés
Association football clubs established in 2009
2009 establishments in Spain
Spanish reserve football teams